is a railway station in Kita-ku, Hamamatsu,  Shizuoka Prefecture, Japan, operated by the third sector Tenryū Hamanako Railroad.

Lines
Tokohadaigakumae Station is served by the Tenryū Hamanako Line, and is located 39.1 kilometers from the starting point of the line at Kakegawa Station.

Station layout
The station has a single side platform serving one bi-directional track. The station is unattended.

Adjacent stations

|-
!colspan=5|Tenryū Hamanako Railroad

Station history
Tokohadaigakumae Station was established on March 13, 1988 as  part of the expansion of services by the Tenryū Hamanako Line after the privatization of Japan National Railways in 1987. It is located to service Hamamatsu University which is within sight of the station. The station was renamed to its present name on April 1, 2013, when the university was renamed.

Passenger statistics
In fiscal 2016, the station was used by an average of 22 passengers daily (boarding passengers only).

Surrounding area
Tokoha University

See also
 List of Railway Stations in Japan

External links

  Tenryū Hamanako Railroad Station information 
 

Railway stations in Shizuoka Prefecture
Railway stations in Japan opened in 1987
Stations of Tenryū Hamanako Railroad
Railway stations in Hamamatsu